Darwin Jesús González Mendoza (born 20 May 1994) is a Venezuelan professional footballer who plays as a midfielder for Cape Town City.

Career
González started his career in the Venezuelan Segunda División with Arroceros. In 2015, González joined Venezuelan Primera División side Deportivo La Guaira. He made his debut for the club on 26 April against Zulia, before scoring two goals in his second appearance versus Tucanes seven days later. He subsequently scored eighteen goals in eighty-one matches across the following 2015, 2016 and 2017 seasons. During which period he also scored goals in the Copa Venezuela and Copa Sudamericana. In July 2017, González was loaned to Patronato of the Argentine Primera División. Three appearances followed.

On 15 January 2019, González moved to Tunisian football after agreeing a move to Étoile du Sahel; penning a three-and-a-half year contract. In 2020, Étoile were handed a transfer ban after failing to pay fees to Deportivo La Guaira for the deal involving González.

Career statistics
.

Honours
Deportivo La Guaira
Copa Venezuela: 2015

Étoile du Sahel
Arab Club Champions Cup: 2018–19

References

External links

1994 births
Living people
People from Calabozo
Venezuelan footballers
Association football midfielders
Venezuelan expatriate footballers
Expatriate footballers in Argentina
Expatriate footballers in Tunisia
Venezuelan expatriate sportspeople in Argentina
Venezuelan expatriate sportspeople in Tunisia
Venezuelan Primera División players
Argentine Primera División players
Tunisian Ligue Professionnelle 1 players
Deportivo La Guaira players
Club Atlético Patronato footballers
Étoile Sportive du Sahel players